This is the discography of Taiwanese pop singer Vivian Hsu.

As a member of Shaonu Dui
December 25, 1990 Merry Christmas (PS I Love You) single
1991 我的心要出旅行 (py. Wǒ de Xīn Yào Chǔ Lǔxíng, en. My Heart Must Go Travel)
June 1992 偏愛你的心 (py. Piānài Nǐ de Xīn, en. Prefer Your Heart)

As a member of Black Biscuits
September 1997 1997-09 Stamina single (ZH), BMG
December 19, 1997 Stamina single (JP), BMG: BVDR-5001
April 1998 Timing single (ZH, JP), BMG: BVDR-5002
October 1998 Relax single (ZH, JP), BMG: BVDR-5003
May 1999 Bye-Bye single (ZH, JP), BMG
May 26, 1999 Life, BMG: 74321-66897-2 90732

As a member of The d.e.p
April 1, 2001 Mr. No Problem single, Sony: SRCL-5047
May 15, 2001 地球的病気 -We Are the d.e.p-, Sony: SMD 8419
August 2001 Itai single, Sony

As Vivian or Kazuma
January 29, 2003 Moment single, Sony SME: SRCL 5537
July 7, 2004 Moment Remixes single, Sony SME: SECL 108

Solo albums and singles
August 1995 Whisper Message single
October 25, 1995 Kuchibiru no Shinwa single, Toshiba: TODT-3557
March 6, 1996 Kyohansha single, Toshiba: TODT-3637
April 10, 1996 天使想 (py. Tiānshǐ Xiǎng, jp. Tenshi Sou, en. Angel Dreaming), Toshiba: TOCT-9375
July 31, 1996 Hachigatsu no Valentine single, Toshiba: TODT-3765
October 10, 1996 天使美少女 (kr. Cheonsa Misonyeo, py. Tiānshǐ Měishàonǔ, jp. Tenshi Bishoujo, en. Angel Prettygirl), SAMPONY
April 29, 1998 大麻煩 (py. Dà Máfán, en. Big Trouble), BMG: 74321585252-0 9054-2
October 26, 1998 想 New Edition a.k.a. 1st. Album (a reprint of Tianshi Xiang plus two new tracks), Toshiba: TOCT-10587
October 18, 1999 不敗の戀人 (py. Bùbài de Liànrén, en. Undefeatable Lover), BMG: 74321 726702
March 23, 2000 Fuhai no Koibito (Japanese version of Bubai de Lianren, with some track substitutions), BMG: BCVR-11018
May 23, 2000 Happy Past Days (Taiwanese version of Fuhai no Koibito plus two new tracks), BMG: 74321 761012
September 19, 2000 假扮的天使 (py. Jiǎbàn de Tiānshǐ, en. Pretend Angel), BMG: 74321-796722-2
March 2001 愛の瑄言 *精選輯 (py. Ài de Xuān Yìn *Jīngxuǎn Jì) compilation album, BMG: 74321-855092
November 7, 2001 (as "Lil' Viv") Marry Me? single, EMI: TOCT-4336
August 2003 決定愛你 single (py. Juédìng Ài Nǐ, en. Decide to Love You), Avex
September 28, 2003 我愛你 x4 the secret to happiness is love Avex: AVTCD-90034 (limited), AVTCD-95723 (regular)
April 1, 2005 狠狠愛 (py. Hěn Hěn Ài), Avex: AVCCD90063A
September 19, 2006 Vivi and... Avex: AVTCD95920
March 9, 2007 Love Vivian 最愛是V 新歌+精選 (py. Love Vivian Zui Ai Shi V XinGe + Jingxuan) compilation album, Avex:AVCCD90090D1
November 18, 2008  絕對收藏徐若瑄2CD  Avex: 88697437192
March 3, 2010 Beautiful Day single (Kuruneko theme song)
September 1, 2010 NICE AND NAUGHTYsingle
April 1, 2011 Natural Beauty Japanese album
December 30, 2014 敬女人 EP
November 7, 2018 Unworthy不值得 single 
March 16, 2020 別人的 Taiwanese(台語) single (movie 孤味 theme song)

Discographies of Taiwanese artists
Mandopop discographies